James Henry Stoddart October 13, 1827 – December 9, 1907) was a popular American stage actor originally from Britain, active on the American stage from 1854 until 1905.

Stoddart was born in Yorkshire, the son of an actor at the Theatre Royal, Glasgow.  After acting in Britain (starting as a youth), he came to Wallack's Theatre in New York in 1854 -- his first appearance was in a small role in A Phenomenon in a Smock Frock.  After two seasons with Wallack's, he joined Laura Keene's company, and later returning to Wallack's.  He played and had his longest term success with A.M. Palmer's Union Square Theater stock company, with which he was connected for 20 years.  Generally a stock player, late in his career he also achieved stardom playing the role of Lachlan Campbell in the 1901 popular play The Bonnie Brier Bush.  His autobiography, The Recollections of a Player, was published in 1902.  He retired from the stage in 1905 due to illness.

Stoddart married actress Matilda Phillips in 1855.  Stoddart died at his home in Sewaren, New Jersey on December 9, 1907.(11 December 1907). Obituary - J.H. Stoddart, New York Tribune, p. 7.(10 December 1907). Actor Stoddart Dead - Was Eighty Years Old - Last Appearance in 1905, Evening Star(10 December 1907). Veteran Actor Stoddart Dead, The New York TimesWhite, Jr., Matthew (May 1895). A Favorite Actor of the Old School, Munsey's Magazine, pp. 173-75

References

External links

Recollections of a Player (autobiography, published 1902)

1827 births
1907 deaths
19th-century American male actors
20th-century American male actors